Anthropoid is a 2016 war film directed by Sean Ellis and starring Cillian Murphy, Jamie Dornan, Charlotte Le Bon, Anna Geislerová, Harry Lloyd, and Toby Jones. It was written by Ellis and Anthony Frewin. It tells the story of Operation Anthropoid, the World War II assassination of Reinhard Heydrich by exiled Czechoslovak soldiers Jozef Gabčík and Jan Kubiš on 27 May 1942. It was released on 12 August 2016 in the United States and 9 September 2016 in the United Kingdom.

Plot
In December 1941, German occupation in Europe has neared its height. Two agents from the Czechoslovak exile government, a Slovak soldier, Jozef Gabčík and  a Czech, Jan Kubiš are parachuted into their occupied country. Jozef is injured when he crashes through a tree upon landing, but both men set out to find their contact in the resistance movement. They are discovered shortly afterwards by fake resistance fighters who turn out to be traitors; one is shot by Jozef but the other man escapes. Stealing their truck, the agents head for Prague.

When they seek out their contact, they are directed to Dr. Eduard, a veterinary surgeon who stitches Jozef's foot, and arranges for them to meet other resistance members, led by "Uncle" Jan Zelenka-Hajský. They are located in a concealed basement of the Saints Cyril and Methodius Cathedral in Prague. Gabčík and Kubiš reveal that they are to carry out "Operation Anthropoid," the assassination of Reinhard Heydrich, the main architect of the Final Solution, and the Reichsprotektor of German–occupied Czechoslovakia.

With limited sources of intelligence and equipment, Jozef and Jan must find a way to assassinate Heydrich, an operation which they hope will change the face of Europe. With the help of two young women, Marie Kovárníková and Lenka Fafková along with other plotters, the agents plan to ambush Heydrich as he arrives at his headquarters by car. When the agents learn that Heydrich is about to be transferred to France, the plan goes into effect straightaway with the duo bolstered by the addition of other agents who have been parachuted into Czechoslovakia and the remaining resistance fighters in Prague.

On 27 May 1942 the assassination attempt is carried out; it nearly fails when Jozef's Sten submachine gun jams, but Heydrich is severely wounded by Jan's grenade, which shatters his limousine. Immediately afterwards, both agents go on the run. In response, SS security forces round up thousands of Czech citizens and carry out reprisals, during which Lenka is killed trying to escape Nazi arrest. Heydrich soon dies from his injuries in the hospital.

Reprisals continue with the village of Lidice destroyed, all the males over the age of 16 being shot, and the women and children sent to concentration camps. The family with whom Jozef and Jan stayed is punished, their house being attacked by numerous Gestapo officers. The mother commits suicide by taking a cyanide pill. The son is brutally tortured and reveals Jozef and Jan's hiding place. Hundreds of troops storm the cathedral where all the agents, including Jozef and Jan, are killed in a fierce six hour battle, along with many German soldiers. In 1947, Resistance fighter Karel Čurda was convicted and executed for turning in his fellow resistance agents for the offered reward.

Ultimately, a total of 5,000 Czechs and Slovaks were killed in the aftermath of the "Heydrich Terror". The assassination of Heydrich was the only successful Allied-organised assault on a top-ranking Nazi official in the Second World War.

Cast
Cillian Murphy as Jozef Gabčík
Jamie Dornan as Jan Kubiš
Charlotte Le Bon as Marie Kovárníková
Anna Geislerová as Lenka Fafková
Harry Lloyd as Adolf Opálka
Toby Jones as Uncle Hajský
Alena Mihulová as Mrs. Moravec 
Marcin Dorociński as Ladislav Vaněk
Bill Milner as Ata Moravec
Sam Keeley as Josef Bublík
Jiří Šimek as Karel Čurda
Mish Boyko as Jan Hrubý
Václav Neužil as Josef Valcik
Andrej Polák as Jaroslav Svarc
Sean Mahon as Dr. Eduard
Detlef Bothe as Reinhard Heydrich
Nicolai Borger as German Soldier at Barricade

Production
In March 2015, Jamie Dornan and Cillian Murphy were cast in Anthropoid, with Sean Ellis directing a screenplay written by Ellis and Anthony Frewin. In May 2015, LD Entertainment boarded the film, announcing the casting of Charlotte Le Bon.

The film was shot entirely in Prague during the summer of 2015, and where possible, at the actual locations of the events they depict. Director Sean Ellis stated in interview that scenes in the Orthodox Cathedral of Saints Cyril and Methodius were filmed on an exact replica of the church on a studio backlot, so as to make the location recognisable to Czech viewers. Gestapo and Czech contemporary reports allowed Ellis to recreate the film's final act (the assassination and church siege) with extreme accuracy, and intense planning was necessary to allow for the assassination itself to play in real time, with each resistance member's movements researched, planned and tracked in order to reflect actual events.

The principal photography for Anthropoid includes backdrops such as Prague Castle and the Charles Bridge in Prague, the locations where Operation Anthropoid took place. At the premiere screening and later advance screenings, audience members noted that the authentic street scenes were featured in the film.

Release
In July 2015, the first image of Dornan and Murphy was released. In May 2016, Bleecker Street acquired U.S distribution rights to the film. In June 2016, the first trailer was released.

Anthropoid had its world premiere at the Karlovy Vary International Film Festival on 1 July 2016 as the opening night film. It was released in the United States on 12 August 2016.

Critical reception
On review aggregation website Rotten Tomatoes, Anthropoid has an approval rating of 67% based on 108 reviews, with an average rating of 6.50/10. On Metacritic, the film has a weighted average score of 59 out of 100, based on 29 critics, indicating "mixed or average reviews". The film has garnered praise for its commitment to realism and true events.

In his review for The Guardian, Peter Bradshaw wrote, "An intelligent, tough, and gripping movie."Varietys chief film critic Peter Debruge felt that "Jamie Dornan and Cillian Murphy spearhead a mission to assassinate a top-ranking Nazi officer in a thriller that doesn't actually get thrilling until after the deed is done." The Washington Posts Christopher Kompanek gave the film four out of four stars, writing: Anthropoid never feels formulaic—a surprise in a summer release. (With luck, Academy Award voters won't forget this one.)"

Accolades
At the Czech Lion Awards, Anthropoid received 12 nominations, out of 14 categories in which it was eligible (all except best actress and best supporting actress). The film lost all 12 nominations to A Prominent Patient. Anthropoid won the non-statutory Czech Lion in the "Film Fans Award" category.

See also
Dramatic portrayals of Reinhard Heydrich

Other films on this subject:
Hangmen Also Die! (1943)
Hitler's Madman (1943)
The Silent Village (1943)
Atentát (1964)
Operation Daybreak (1975)
Lidice (2011)
The Man with the Iron Heart (2017)

References

Notes

Bibliography

Burgess, Alan. Seven Men at Daybreak. New York: Bantam Books, 1983. .
Ramen, Fred. Reinhard Heydrich: Hangman of the Third Reich. New York: Rosen Publishing Group, 2001. .

External links

Official screenplay

2010s historical films
2010s war films
Films about Operation Anthropoid
Films about assassinations
Bleecker Street films
Universal Pictures films
Czech war films
Czech historical films
Czech Lion Awards winners (films)
British historical films
British war films
World War II films based on actual events
Films set in the Czech Republic
Films set in Prague
Films set in 1942
Films shot in the Czech Republic
Films shot in Prague
Films shot in Hungary
Films shot in Budapest
English-language French films
Czech resistance to Nazi occupation in film
English-language Czech films
Czech World War II films
British World War II films
French World War II films
Czech epic films
2010s English-language films
2010s British films
2010s French films
Czech films based on actual events